Stordrange is a Norwegian surname. Notable people with the surname include:

Bjørn Stordrange (born 1956), Norwegian jurist and politician
Kolbjørn Stordrange (1924–2004), Norwegian politician

Norwegian-language surnames